Lord Beresford may refer to:

William Beresford, 1st Viscount Beresford (1768–1854), British soldier, Governor of Jersey
Lord William Beresford (1847–1900), Irish soldier and holder of the Victoria Cross
Charles Beresford, 1st Baron Beresford (1846–1919), better known as Lord Charles Beresford, British naval commander and politician, great-nephew of the 1st Viscount